George V Land is a segment of Antarctica part of the land claimed as part of the Australian Antarctic Territory, inland from the George V Coast. As with other segments of Antarctica, it is defined by two lines of longitude, 142°02' E and 153°45' E, and by the 60°S parallel.

This region was first explored by members of the Main Base party of the Australasian Antarctic Expedition (1911–14) under Douglas Mawson, who named this feature for King George V of Australia.

References

External links
 
 George V Land on USGS website
 George V Land on SCAR website

 
Australian Antarctic Territory
Lands of Antarctica